Saman Bird Sanctuary is in Mainpuri district, in western Uttar Pradesh. It has been designated as a protected Ramsar site since 2019.

Getting There
Mainpuri is the nearest railhead. Also, UPSRTC operates city buses to and from the main archaeological sites. Agra is the nearest Airport.

Attractions
The sanctuary is spread over an area of 5 km2. There are many birds which can be seen here and the sanctuary is best suited for Bird safari. Also there are different animals such as Jackal, Mongoose, Hare and various local and migratory birds.

The best time to visit the sanctuary is between November & February.

Birds here include Sarus Cranes and Black Necked Stork as well as sharp hunters like Egyptian vulture, Sparrow Hawk, Black Shouldered Kite, Crested Serpent Eagle and Black Kite. Some Small species of birds are also residing in nearby areas of the Sanctuary like Magpie Robin, Rufous Fronted Prinia, Little Green Bee-eater, Tailor Bird and Ashy Prinia. Indian Grey Hornbill, Lineated Barbet, Yellow Footed Green Pigeon and Asian Openbill are some of the species which are not common for an area like this.

The Sarus Crane is one of the most beautiful bird of Indian Subcontinent, its presence in Mainpuri District shows that this area has a special importance for this creature, that's why in the logo of Clean Mainpuri Beautiful Mainpuri (Swatch Mainpuri Sunder Mainpuri) the district authorities have also given a special symbol status to The Sarus Crane.

References

External links
http://www.world-wildlife-adventures.com/india/wildlife-park.asp?sanctuary=Saman+Bird+Sanctuary&state=Uttar+Pradesh
http://envfor.nic.in/report/0607/Annex-06.pdf

Bird sanctuaries of Uttar Pradesh
Ramsar sites in India
Mainpuri district
Lakes of Uttar Pradesh
1980 establishments in Uttar Pradesh
Protected areas established in 1980